Artaserse is an opera (dramma per musica) in three acts composed by Johann Adolph Hasse to an Italian libretto adapted from that by Metastasio by Giovanni Boldini first shown in Venice on 11 February 1730.

History 
Artaserse premiered at the Teatro di San Giovanni Grisostomo in Venice on 11 February 1730, just 6 days after the libretto's first setting by Leonardo Vinci premiered in Rome.

Hasse wrote three settings of this libretto. The original one dates from 1730, just before he became Kapellmeister in Dresden. A second setting was made for the Court Theatre in Dresden in 1740. Finally, he composed a third one in 1760, when he was nearing the end of his career as Kapellmeister in Dresden.

His style, as well as musical taste, underwent considerable change during those 30 odd years, so much so that not a lot of the 1760 version (Teatro di San Carlo, Naples) sounds like the music of the 1730 and the 1740 versions. For instance, at the end of the first act of the 1760 version, Mandane's accompanied recitative and aria in which she calls upon the ghost of her father, King Xerxes, has been removed. Although this differs from the previous versions, this change actually makes the drama closer to the original by Metastasio.

To those three versions solely by Hasse, one must also add a myriad of pasticcios which use Hasse's setting as a basis, including for instance the notable Autumn 1734 London production put together by Nicola Porpora, starring Farinelli in arias written by Riccardo Broschi, but also, earlier that same year, a production for the Venice Carnival including additional music by Galuppi, starring both Farinelli and Caffarelli!

Hasse's Artaserse, in full or at least in part, was produced in:
 1730: Venice, Lucca, Milan
 1731: Brno, Ferrara, Kroměříž
 1733: Verona
 1734: Venice and London
 1735: London
 1736: London
 1737: Bergamo
 1738: Bergamo and Graz
 1739: Modena
 1740: Ljubljana and Dresden
 1745: Ferrara
 1754: London
 1760: Warsaw and Naples
 1762: Naples
 1765: Ferrara
 1766: London
 1772: London
 1773: London
 1774: London
 1779: London
 1785: London

Synopsis 
Artaserse is based on the life of king Artaxerxes I of Persia, a ruler of the fifth century B.C., son of Xerxes I.

Seeing King Serse I's power in serious decline and ambitioning to mount the throne, Artabano, the commander of the royal guards and a powerful official in the Persian court, has murdered the sovereign and is now hoping to sacrifice the rest of the royal family to his design. And so, he accuses Dario, Serses I's eldest son and older brother of Artaserse, of the regicide and persuades the latter to avenge the crime. After Dario's demise, the only thing left wanting is now the death of Artaserse, which Artabano has plotted, but his plans are delayed by a succession of various incidents and in the meantime the treason is revealed.

Roles

Aria distribution 
Color key:

  Artaserse
  Mandane
  Artabano
  Arbace
  Semira
  Megabise
  Duetto / coro
  No aria in the scene
  Scene does not exist

In Hasse's settings

In other productions 
The arias in bold italic are arias that are not part of Hasse's original opera.

Performers and voice types
Color key:
  Unknown
  Soprano
  Contralto
  Tenor
  Bass
  Soprano castrato
  Contralto castrato

In Hasse's settings

In other productions

Recordings

 Hasse, J A: Artaserse (1730 Venice version). Orchestra Internazionale d'Italia, conductor: Corrado Rovaris; Anicio Zorzi Giustiniani (tenor) as Artaserse, Maria Grazia Schiavo (soprano) as Mandane, Sonia Prina (contralto) as Artabano, Franco Fagioli (countertenor) as Arbace, Rosa Bove (mezzo-soprano) as Semira, Antonio Giovannini (countertenor) as Megabise. Recording date: July 2012, Festival della Valle d'Itria, Martina Franca release: 2016, Label: Dynamic Cat. CDS7715/1–3 (CD), 37715 (DVD).
Hasse: Artaserse. David Hansen, Vivica Genaux, Carlo Vistoli, Andrew Goodwin, Russell Harcourt, Emily Edmonds, Orchestra of the Antipodes, Erin Helyard. Pinchgut Opera, PG011, 2020.

References

External links
 
 

1730 operas
Italian-language operas
Operas by Johann Adolf Hasse
Operas